877 Naval Air Squadron (877 NAS) was a Naval Air Squadron of the Royal Navy's Fleet Air Arm. The squadron formed at Tanga, Tanganyika Territory in April 1943 as a Fleet Fighter unit for local defence duties, using RAF Hurricane IIBs. In July 1943 the squadron moved to Port Reitz, Mombasa with the intention to fly with long-range fuel tanks to the defence of Ceylon but this was cancelled and the squadron disbanded in December 1943.

References

 

800 series Fleet Air Arm squadrons
Military units and formations established in 1943
Military units and formations of the Royal Navy in World War II